was a Japanese ophthalmologist who is recognized for his description of what is now known as Vogt–Koyanagi–Harada disease (VKH).

Koyanagi received his medical education at the Imperial University in Kyoto. He graduated in 1908 and studied ophthalmology under Ikujiro Asayama. He held a variety of positions, eventually retiring in 1942. In recognition of his contributions, the government conferred on him the posthumous Decoration of the Second Order of the Sacred Treasure.

His first description of what is now known as Vogt–Koyanagi–Harada disease was in 1914. This was preceded by Jujiro Komoto, Professor of Ophthalmology at the University of Tokyo, in 1911. However, it was a much later article, published in 1929, in which he typified the time course of the disease as it went through its sequential phases, that definitively associated Koyanagi with VKH disease.

References 

Japanese ophthalmologists
1880 births
1954 deaths